Miloš Kralj (born 26 October 1946) is a Yugoslav sprint canoer who competed in the early 1970s. At the 1972 Summer Olympics in Munich, he was eliminated in the repechages of the K-2 1000 m event and the semifinals of the K-4 1000 m event.

References
Sports-reference.com profile

1946 births
Canoeists at the 1972 Summer Olympics
Living people
Olympic canoeists of Yugoslavia
Yugoslav male canoeists